Nirimba may refer to:

 Nirimba, Queensland, a locality in the Sunshine Coast Region, Queensland, Australia
 Nirimba, Western Australia, a locality in the Shire of Murray, Western Australia
 HMAS Nirimba,  a former Royal Australian Navy training base in Schofields, Sydney, New South Wales, Australia.